James William Ambler (23 August 1887 – 8 August 1956) was an Australian rules footballer, who played with Collingwood in the Victorian Football League (VFL).

Notes

External links 

Jim Ambler's profile at Collingwood Forever

1887 births
1956 deaths
Australian rules footballers from Victoria (Australia)
Collingwood Football Club players